The 2023 Bayelsa State gubernatorial election will take place on 11 November 2023, to elect the Governor of Bayelsa State. Incumbent PDP Governor Douye Diri is running for re-election. The primaries are scheduled for between 27 March and 17 April 2022.

Electoral system 
The Governor of Bayelsa State is elected is elected using a modified two-round system. To be elected in the first round, a candidate must receive the plurality of the vote and over 25% of the vote in at least two-thirds of state local government areas. If no candidate passes this threshold, a second round will be held between the top candidate and the next candidate to have received a plurality of votes in the highest number of local government areas.

Background
Bayelsa State is a small state in the South South mainly populated by Ijaw peoples; although its oil reserves make it one of the most resource-rich states in the nation, Bayelsa has faced challenges in security and environmental degradation in large part due to years of systemic corruption and illegal oil bunkering.

Politically, the state's early 2019 elections were categorized as the continuation of the PDP's dominance albeit with the APC making considerable gains by gaining one senate and two House of Representatives seats. The APC also gained ground in the assembly election and Bayelsa also was the state that swung the most towards Buhari in the presidential election, although that could be chalked up to former Governor Goodluck Jonathan no longer being PDP nominee. Later in 2019, the swing towards the APC dramatically increased as its gubernatorial nominee David Lyon won by a large margin but Diri was declared victor after Lyon was disqualified before the inauguration. Ensuing senate by-elections in 2020 were then easily won by the PDP, cementing the state's potentially erratic voting record.

During its term, the Diri administration's stated focuses included the economic diversification, agricultural development, and the completion of the Bayelsa International Airport. In terms of his performance, Diri was commended for the completion of the airport and the Nembe Unity Bridge while being criticized for forcing his way past airport security checkpoints in August 2021 and praising former military dictator Sani Abacha.

Primary elections 
The primaries, along with any potential challenges to primary results, will take place between 27 March and 17 April 2022.

All Progressives Congress 
In February 2022, the national APC announced its gubernatorial primaries' schedule, setting its expression of interest form price at ₦10 million and nomination form price at ₦40 million with a 50% nomination form discount for candidates younger than 40 while women and candidates with disabilities get free nomination forms. Both primary forms were sold from 14 to 22 February 2023. The form submission deadline was set for 22 February while candidates would be screened between 24 and 26 February. Ward congresses were set for 8 April in Bayelsa and Imo states to elect delegates for the primary while the Kogi congresses had been held on 8 February. Candidates approved by the screening process advanced to a primary set for 10 April, in concurrence with the other APC gubernatorial primaries; challenges to the result could be made on 12 April.

Purchased forms 
 David Lyon: 2019 APC gubernatorial nominee
 Timipre Sylva: Minister of State for Petroleum Resources (2019–present), 2015 APC gubernatorial nominee, and former Governor (2007–2008; 2008–2012)

Potential 
 Peremobowei Ebebi: 2020 Bayelsa West senatorial by-election nominee and former Deputy Governor
 Heineken Lokpobiri: former Minister of State for Agriculture and Rural Development (2015–2019) and former Senator for Bayelsa West (2007–2015)

People's Democratic Party 
On 1 December 2022, the national PDP announced its gubernatorial primaries' schedule. Both primary forms—the expression of interest and nomination forms—were sold from 16 to 31 January 2023, aside from Kogi State where the deadline was later extended to 13 February. Similarly, all form submission deadlines were pushed back from 13 February to 1 March. Ward congresses were set for 28-29 March and LGA congresses were rescheduled for 8 April to elect delegates for the primary. Candidates approved by the screening process advanced to a primary set for 14-15 May, in concurrence with all other PDP gubernatorial primaries; challenges to the result could be made in the following days.

Purchased forms 
 Douye Diri: Governor (2020–present)

Potential 
 Timi Alaibe: 2019 PDP gubernatorial candidate and former NDDC Managing Director/CEO

Conduct

Electoral timetable

General election

Results

By senatorial district 
The results of the election by senatorial district.

By federal constituency
The results of the election by federal constituency.

By local government area 
The results of the election by local government area.

Notes

References 

Bayelsa State gubernatorial election
2023
Bayelsa
gubernatorial